DeVilbiss may refer to:
 DeVilbiss Automotive Refinishing
DeVilbiss High School (Toledo, Ohio), American high school which existed 1931–1991, full name Thomas A. DeVilbiss High School

People
Lydia Allen DeVilbiss (1882–1964), American physician